In organic chemistry, methenium (also called methylium, carbenium, methyl cation, or protonated methylene) is a cation with the formula . It can be viewed as a methylene radical with an added proton, or as a methyl radical (•) with one electron removed. It is a carbocation and an enium ion, making it the simplest of the carbenium ions.

Structure
Experiments and calculations generally agree that the methenium ion is planar, with threefold symmetry. The carbon atom is a prototypical (and exact) example of sp2 hybridization.

Preparation and reactions
In such conditions, it will react with acetonitrile  to form the ion .

Upon capture of a low-energy electron (less than ), it will spontaneously dissociate.

It is seldom encountered as an intermediate in the condensed phase. It is proposed as a reactive intermediate that forms upon protonation or hydride abstraction of methane with FSO3H-SbF5. The methenium ion is very reactive, even towards alkanes.

See also
 Methanium
 Ammonium
 Ethanium

References

Carbocations
Ions
Organic chemistry